Kevin Williamson's and Wes Craven's American meta horror slasher film series Scream features a large cast of characters created primarily by Kevin Williamson with contributions from Craven and Ehren Kruger. The series focuses on a succession of murderers who adopt a ghost-like disguise, dubbed Ghostface, who taunt and attempt to kill Sidney Prescott (Neve Campbell) in the first four films, as well as half-sisters Sam and Tara Carpenter (Melissa Barrera and Jenna Ortega) and twin siblings Chad and Mindy Meeks-Martin (Mason Gooding and Jasmin Savoy Brown), referred to as the "Core Four", in the fifth and sixth films. The series comprises six films: Scream (1996), Scream 2 (1997), Scream 3 (2000), Scream 4 (2011), Scream (2022) and Scream VI (2023). Other major recurring characters include ambitious news reporter Gale Weathers (Courteney Cox), police officer Dewey Riley (David Arquette), film-geek Randy Meeks (Jamie Kennedy), falsely accused Cotton Weary (Liev Schreiber), and FBI agent Kirby Reed (Hayden Panettiere).

The first four films in the series were directed by Craven and scored by Marco Beltrami. Williamson wrote Scream, Scream 2 and Scream 4, but scheduling commitments meant he could provide only notes for Scream 3, with writing duties instead helmed by Ehren Kruger, while Matt Bettinelli-Olpin and Tyler Gillett direct the fifth and sixth films, with writing duties instead helmed by James Vanderbilt and Guy Busick.

Each film provides a motive and grounds for suspicion for several characters, concealing the identity of the true killer or killers until the finale, in which their identities and motivations are revealed. In Scream, the fictional town of Woodsboro is besieged by a masked killer who focuses on Sidney, revealed in the finale as Sidney's boyfriend Billy Loomis (Skeet Ulrich), aided by his friend Stu Macher (Matthew Lillard). Billy admits to being responsible for the murder of Sidney's mother Maureen Prescott, to take revenge for an affair Maureen had with Billy's father that caused his mother to "abandon" him. In Scream 2, copycat killers again stalk Sidney and her friends, before being revealed as Sidney's friend Mickey Altieri (Timothy Olyphant) and Billy Loomis' mother (Laurie Metcalf). In Scream 3, another killer hunts Sidney, claiming to have knowledge of Sidney's tragic past, prior to the events of the original film. The killer is revealed to be Roman Bridger (Scott Foley), Sidney's half-brother, who wants revenge for his rejection and abandonment by their mother. Roman is revealed to have been responsible for convincing Billy to kill Maureen before the events of Scream, setting in motion the events that occur in each successive film. In Scream 4, a killer appears when Sidney returns to Woodsboro on the fifteenth anniversary of the original killings. This killer is revealed to be Sidney's cousin Jill Roberts (Emma Roberts), with horror film fan Charlie Walker (Rory Culkin) serving as her accomplice. In Scream (2022), the killers are revealed to be horror fans Amber Freeman (Mikey Madison) and Richie Kirsch (Jack Quaid) who, dissatisfied with what Stab (a slasher film series based on previous Ghostface killings) has become, decide to make their own new "source material" for it with their own killings, meaning to frame Billy's daughter Sam for them. In Scream VI, the first two killers are revealed as film students Jason Carvey (Tony Revolori) and Greg Bruckner (Thom Newell), former classmates of Richie's seeking to "finish Richie's movie", before three other independent killers are revealed as Richie's family: siblings Quinn (Liana Liberato) and Ethan (Jack Champion), and father Wayne Bailey (Dermot Mulroney): seeking revenge on the Carpenter sisters for Richie's murder (with all of Richie's "victims" having survived their injuries, Amber having been the only true "killer").

The Scream series has received several awards, including a Saturn Award for Best Actress and an MTV Movie Award for Best Performance for Neve Campbell and a Saturn Award for Best Horror Film for Scream.

Cast overview

Introduced in Scream (1996)

Scream is the first film in the Scream series. One year prior to the events of the film, Maureen Prescott is brutally raped and murdered, apparently by Cotton Weary. During the film, the fictional town of Woodsboro is again attacked by a murderer, who particularly targets Sidney Prescott, Maureen's daughter. Deputy Sheriff Dewey Riley investigates the murders, while news reporter Gale Weathers follows the story. Sidney, her boyfriend Billy Loomis and their friends Tatum Riley, Stu Macher and Randy Meeks try to survive the attacks. The killer is revealed as both Billy and Stu, who admit to having killed Maureen and framed Cotton for the act. Sidney then kills them both in retribution.

Principal Arthur Himbry
 Portrayed by Henry Winkler (uncredited)
 Appeared in: Scream
Arthur Himbry is the principal of Woodsboro High School, attended by Sidney Prescott and her friends. He disciplines several students for wearing Ghostface masks, and comforts Sidney after she narrowly escapes the killer. While in his office, he is attacked by Ghostface and is stabbed to death. His body was said to have been discovered hanging up on the school's goalposts.

Scream producer Bob Weinstein had Himbry's death added to the movie after he realized that the film had "30 pages of script" without a death occurring. By chance, this gave writer Kevin Williamson a reason for the teenagers to leave Stu Macher's party during the film's finale, a plot point Williamson had been struggling to formulate. The language used by Himbry and his aggressive actions towards the students were among several reasons why the film's production was forced to leave Santa Rosa High School: the school board found the film's content unacceptable and did not want it filmed there.

Billy Loomis
 Portrayed by Skeet Ulrich
 Appeared in: Scream (1996), Scream (2022), Scream VI (2023)
William "Billy" Loomis is a Woodsboro teenager, the boyfriend of Sidney Prescott and best friend of Stu Macher. He is also an avid fan of horror films. Following a series of murders, Billy becomes a suspect when he is found at Sidney's house with a cellphone shortly after she is taunted on the phone and attacked by a masked killer. Evidence is discovered that points to other characters, and Billy is removed as a suspect. During a party at Stu Macher's home, Billy and Sidney are reconciled and have sex, before Billy is stabbed by Ghostface. Later after a series of attacks, Billy is revealed to be alive and tries to help Sidney, obtaining in the process a gun which he then uses to shoot Randy Meeks. Billy then reveals himself to be the killer, having feigned the injury in the first place, with Stu confessing to be Billy's accomplice. The pair also admit to having murdered Sidney's mother, Maureen Prescott, one year previously, after she had an affair with Billy's father, causing Billy's parents to divorce and his mother to "abandon" him. He dies after Sidney shoots him in the head.

In Scream 2, Billy's mother seeks revenge on Sidney for Billy's death. In Scream 3, Roman Bridger reveals that he provided Billy the evidence of his father's affair and gave him advice on how to kill Maureen. In Scream (2022), it is revealed that Billy cheated on Sidney, fathered a daughter named Sam Carpenter (whom he wasn't aware of) and appears in her visions throughout the film, encouraging her to fight back against the killers trying to murder her, and thus the hallucinations project images of Billy as the good man Sam wished he was.

In "Stab", the fictional film within a film based on the murders, Billy is portrayed by Luke Wilson. The character is parodied in the film Scary Movie as Bobby Prinze, portrayed by Jon Abrahams.

Kevin Patrick Walls and Justin Whalin were final contenders for the role of Billy Loomis before it was won by Skeet Ulrich. Walls was instead cast in the minor role of Steve Orth.

Casey Becker

 Portrayed by Drew Barrymore
 Appeared in: Scream

Casey Becker is a Woodsboro teenager and the former girlfriend of Stu Macher. After receiving a taunting and threatening phone call, she is ordered to answer horror film trivia questions to save the life of her boyfriend, Steve Orth. When she answers incorrectly, Steve is disemboweled and she is asked another question to save her own life. When she refuses to answer, Ghostface chases her down and kills her, leaving her hanged from a tree and disemboweled. Later, it is revealed by Billy Loomis and Stu (who are Casey's Ghostface killers) that even if she answered correctly, they would have killed her anyway. In "Stab", the fictional film within a film based on the murders, Casey is played by Heather Graham.

Barrymore was already a successful actress when she appeared in Scream, at a time when casting a big name for a horror film was uncommon. She was originally signed to play the role of Sidney after reading the script and approaching the production team herself. However she decided she would rather play the part of Casey Becker because of her connection to the character and wanting to deliver a shock to the audience. It was not due to a scheduling conflict even though a very popular rumor states it was. This has been debunked by Barrymore herself as well as Wes Craven. Like her co-stars Neve Campbell and Courteney Cox, her appearance is credited by Craven for raising the profile of the film and helping to attract a larger female audience.

Several scenes leading to Casey's eventual death gave rise to disputes between Craven and the Motion Picture Association of America (MPAA), the film rating board, who raised concerns over the violence and intensity of the scene. When she is initially stabbed in the chest by Ghostface, Craven insisted that he had only been able to make one successful take of the scene, so that no substitution was possible; he was, in fact, lying. The scene in which her corpse is hung from a tree and disemboweled was heavily edited: Craven was forced to remove all still shots of the body, and the scene itself was sped up to reduce its time on screen.

Cotton Weary
 Portrayed by Liev Schreiber
 Appeared in: Scream, Scream 2, Scream 3
Cotton Weary was the original suspect in the rape and murder of Maureen Prescott, Sidney's mother. He was identified by Sidney, who found her mother's body after seeing someone she believed to be Cotton leaving her home. In Scream, it is revealed that Maureen was having an affair with Cotton before she was murdered by Billy Loomis and Stu Macher, who then planted evidence to frame Cotton. In Scream 2, Cotton attempts to gain fame from his incarceration and exoneration for Maureen's murder, traveling to Windsor College to convince Sidney to agree to an interview. He later saves Sidney when she is about to be murdered by Mrs. Loomis, one of the Ghostface killers in Scream 2.

In Scream 3, Cotton has become famous for his exploits, hosting his own talk show. He and his girlfriend Christine Hamilton are attacked by the latest Ghostface, who demands to know the whereabouts of Sidney after she goes into hiding. When Cotton refuses to tell, Ghostface kills him.

In the original Scream 2 script, Cotton was captured by the real Ghostface killers, Derek Feldman, Hallie McDaniel and Mrs. Loomis. After Mrs. Loomis kills Derek and Hallie, she intends to frame Cotton for the recent murder spree, but he attacks and stabs her to death. He then tries to take revenge on Sidney for his false imprisonment, noting that the evidence points to him being an innocent victim. He and Sidney stab each other, but their fates have not been revealed. Following the leak of the script on the Internet, extensive rewrites were undertaken, changing this plot.

Dewey Riley

 Portrayed by David Arquette
 Appeared in: Scream (1996), Scream 2, Scream 3, Scream 4, Scream (2022), Scream VI (photos)
Dwight "Dewey" Riley is the Deputy Sheriff of Woodsboro, the brother of Tatum Riley and friend of Sidney Prescott. After a series of murders, he helps lead the investigation, while pursuing a romance with Gale Weathers. He is stabbed by Ghostface during the finale of Scream, but survives. Dewey returns in Scream 2, suffering from a limp and weakened arm caused by nerve damage as a result of his stabbing. He travels to Windsor College to help Sidney after a series of copycat Ghostface murders. He is attacked and stabbed repeatedly by the current Ghostface but again survives. In Scream 3, he aids an investigation into a new Ghostface, later revealed to be Roman Bridger. Dewey shoots Roman in the head, killing him. In the aftermath he asks Gale to marry him, and she accepts. In Scream 4, Dewey has married Gale and returned with her to Woodsboro, becoming the new Sheriff and recovered from his past injuries. After a new series of Ghostface murders on the anniversary of Billy Loomis' and Stu Macher's spree, Dewey again investigates. By now, his relationship with Gale is strained, but, after Gale is badly injured by Ghostface, they resolve their differences. In the fifth installment of the series, also titled Scream, Dewey and Gale are divorced. After he saves Tara Carpenter from being murdered in the hospital, Ghostface stabs him in the stomach by surprise, pulling the knife up through his torso, causing his death.

Dewey had been intended to die in the finale of the first installment of Scream. However, Craven filmed an additional scene, in which Dewey survives and is placed in an ambulance, in case test audiences reacted positively to the character. When they did, this scene was added to the film, and his death was instead depicted in the fifth installment of Scream.

Arquette was originally brought in to audition for the role of Billy Loomis in Scream, but preferred the character of Dewey and requested to audition for that instead. Despite resistance from the production team, who were concerned that the role was described as "hunky", rather than the younger, goofier approach of Arquette, Craven appreciated the idea and cast him in the role.

In Stab, the fictional film within a film based on the Ghostface murders, and again in Stab 3, Dewey is portrayed by David Schwimmer and fictional actor Tom Prinze, respectively.

Gale Weathers

 Portrayed by Courteney Cox
 Appeared in: Scream (1996), Scream 2, Scream 3, Scream 4, Scream (2022), Scream VI
Gale Weathers is a news reporter for the fictional news show Top Story. Prior to the events of the films, she was involved in coverage of the murder of Maureen Prescott and the resulting trial of Cotton Weary, during which she criticized the testimony of Sidney Prescott. In Scream, she returns to Woodsboro to cover the current murder spree. During the finale of the film, her cameraman, Kenny Jones, is murdered, and she is left for dead after a car crash. She is later revealed to be alive and witnesses the confession of Billy Loomis and Stu Macher to their role in the killings. She helps Sidney defeat Billy and, after the events of the film, writes a new book about the Ghostface murders. In Scream 2, she travels to Windsor College to cover the current murder spree. She witnesses the apparent death of Dewey Riley before she herself is shot by Mickey Altieri, one of the killers. She survives and helps Sidney to kill Mickey. In Scream 3, she is shown to have written another book, this time about the Windsor College killings. She travels to Hollywood to aid the investigation of a new series of murders there. At the end of the film, Dewey asks Gale to marry him, and she accepts. In Scream 4, Gale has married Dewey, becoming Gale Weathers-Riley, but their relationship is strained. She has written a series of novels about fictional Ghostface murders; these have been turned into new films in the fictional Stab series. She attempts to reignite her journalistic career by investigating the new murders, but is attacked and badly wounded by the new Ghostface. She survives and resolves her differences with Dewey.

In the fictional Stab series of films within a film, Gale is portrayed by fictional actress Jennifer Jolie.

Courteney Cox was starring in the NBC sitcom Friends when she was cast in Scream, marking a new trend: casting established and popular actors and actresses in horror films. Craven opined that her presence, like Neve Campbell's, helped raise the profile of Scream and attract a large female audience. Brooke Shields and Janeane Garofalo were the original choices for the role of Gale. Cox was not even considered at first, as it was not believed that she could play Gale's selfish, abusive and aggressive character after playing the softer, nicer role of Monica Geller in Friends. Cox, however, was eager to play a "bitch" character, specifically to contrast with her Friends character, and repeatedly lobbied the production team until she won the role.

Ghostface

 Portrayed by Roger L. Jackson (voice), Skeet Ulrich, Matthew Lillard, Laurie Metcalf, Timothy Olyphant, Scott Foley, Emma Roberts, Rory Culkin, Mikey Madison, Jack Quaid, Tony Revolori, Dermot Mulroney, Jack Champion, Liana Liberato
 Appeared in: Scream (1996), Scream 2, Scream 3, Scream 4, Scream (TV series), Scream (2022), Scream VI
Ghostface is a fictional identity, created in Scream by Sidney's boyfriend Billy Loomis and his friend Stu Macher to conduct a murder spree in the town of Woodsboro. The costume they use is a generic Halloween costume, officially called "Father Death", that allows anyone to adopt the identity and makes the killers difficult to identify. The killers taunt their victims on the phone before attacking, using a voice changer to disguise their true identity. While in costume, the character is voiced by voice actor Roger L. Jackson. The Ghostface identity is adopted by other killers after the death of Billy and Stu. In Scream 2, it is taken by Billy's mother and her accomplice, Mickey Altieri. In Scream 3, it is taken by Sidney's half-brother, Roman Bridger, the director of Stab 3. In Scream 4, on the anniversary of Billy and Stu's murder spree, a new Ghostface emerges, revealed to be Sidney's cousin Jill Roberts and her friend Charlie Walker. In Scream (2022), it's used by Richie Kirsch and Amber Freeman, who are respectively the boyfriend of Sam Carpenter and best friend of her sister Tara. In the finale of each film, the current Ghostface killers confront the protagonist and explain their motivation for stalking her.

Jackson, who voices Ghostface in all the Scream films, was chosen for the part after weeks of local casting in Santa Rosa, California. He was intended only as a temporary voice, to be replaced in the post-production phase of the film with a dubbed voice, but his contribution was retained because Craven felt he imbued the voice with a truly evil malevolence. He and the casts of the films were intentionally prevented from meeting for most if not all of each film's production, to discourage the cast from putting a face to the voice, and to make him seem more menacing when interacting with the characters on the phone.

Hank Loomis 
 Portrayed by C.W. Morgan
 Appeared in: Scream (1996), Scream 3
Hank Loomis is the father of Billy, and the ex-husband of Mrs. Loomis. Hank is a lawyer and represents his son when Billy is brought in to the police station for questioning. It is later revealed that Hank was having an affair with Maureen Prescott, which is what led to his wife leaving him. In the promotional material for Scream 3, it is revealed that Hank used to be the main lawyer for Sunrise Studios, before leaving to set up his own law office in Woodsboro.

Kenny Brown
 Portrayed by W. Earl Brown
 Appeared in: Scream
Kenneth "Kenny" Brown is Gale Weathers' cameraman on the fictional news show "Top Story". In Scream, Kenny accompanies Gale as she reports on the series of murders in Woodsboro. After seeing on a hidden camera that Randy Meeks is about to be murdered, he leaves his van to help, and his throat is slit by Ghostface. His surname is revealed in an Easter egg in the opening of Scream (2022 film).

Kenny's neck being slashed was one of the several scenes that had to be toned down by Craven at the behest of the MPAA in order to avoid the restrictive NC-17 rating. The scene was shortened because the MPAA felt that Kenny's expression after his throat was cut was too disturbing.

Maureen Prescott
 Portrayed by Lynn McRee
 Appeared in: Scream, Scream 2, and Scream 4 (photos only), Scream 3
Maureen Prescott (née Roberts) is the mother of Sidney Prescott and wife of Neil Prescott. She is murdered before the events of the Scream films but receives a mention in every film, with the first four films' killing spree motivations back to her in some way. She conducted several extra-marital affairs, including those with Cotton Weary and Hank Loomis, the father of Billy Loomis. Cotton was arrested and convicted of her murder. In Scream, a killer taunts Sidney on the phone about her mother's murder; this killer is later identified as Sidney's boyfriend Billy Loomis and his friend Stu Macher. Billy reveals that it was he and Stu who murdered Maureen and framed Cotton for it.

In Scream 3, the current Ghostface uses Maureen's synthesized voice and image to taunt Sidney and lure her out of hiding. The killer is unveiled as Roman Bridger, who reveals that he is Maureen's son and Sidney's half-brother. For a two-year period in her youth, before she met Sidney's father, Maureen had traveled to Hollywood to become an actress under the pseudonym Rina Reynolds. During this time she was impregnated with Roman by Hollywood producer John Milton, after being gang-raped. She then gave him up for adoption. When the adult Roman found her, she denied she had been Rina and rejected him. Roman then proceeded to film her affairs and showed the footage to Billy before convincing him to kill Maureen, starting the chain of events that occur throughout the Scream films. Scream 4 introduces Maureen's sister Kate Roberts and her niece Jill Roberts. Sidney observing a photo gallery of Maureen in Kate's home was filmed for Scream 4, but it was deleted from the final cut. Scream (2022) shows Gale's remorse for writing the book about her murder, believing she is responsible for the Ghostface killings after. Sidney reassures her, however that it was Billy Loomis who started it and they will end it.

Neil Prescott
 Portrayed by Lawrence Hecht
 Appeared in: Scream, Scream 3
Neil Prescott is the father of Sidney Prescott and widower of Maureen Prescott. In Scream, he leaves Woodsboro on business and later disappears without trace, raising suspicions that he may be the perpetrator of a series of murders in the town. It is revealed in the finale that he was kidnapped by the real killers, Billy Loomis and Stu Macher, who intended to frame him for their crimes. Neil is saved by his daughter. It is theorized that his absence from Scream 2 is to emphasize Sidney's independence in college; he is mentioned in-film as being out of the country on business. He appears briefly in Scream 3, commenting on Sidney's withdrawal from her friends and life. Scream 4 also introduces his sister-in-law Kate Roberts and his niece Jill Roberts.

Randy Meeks

 Portrayed by Jamie Kennedy
 Appeared in: Scream, Scream 2, Scream 3 (cameo), Scream 5 (photos)
Randy Meeks is a Woodsboro teenager. He is a friend of Sidney Prescott, for whom he has romantic feelings, and is an avid fan of horror movies. He uses his knowledge of horror film plots and clichés to define the series of murders that occur in Scream, Scream 2 and Scream 3. In Scream, he is shot by Billy Loomis but survives. In Scream 2, he attends the fictional Windsor College with Sidney, studying film. When a new series of murders begins, Randy taunts the killer over the phone, mocking Billy Loomis' in the previous film. During this call, the killer dragged him into a van and killed him. It is later revealed that Mrs. Loomis, Billy's mother, killed Randy out of anger at his insults to her son. Randy appears posthumously in Scream 3 in a recorded video, in which he explains to Sidney the rules of a trilogy, similar to how he explained the rules in the first two films.

In the published screenplay for Scream, an alternate ending had Randy (rather than Sidney) kill Stu before asking Sidney out on a date. Before a script leak forced the rewriting of parts of the Scream 2 screenplay, Randy was to be Gale Weathers' cameraman rather than a student as shown in the finished film. His death, however, remained the same. Craven and Ehren Kruger considered bringing Randy back in Scream 3, revealing him to have survived his attack in Scream 2 but abandoned the idea as too unrealistic.

Casting for Randy was contested between Kennedy and Breckin Meyer. The production team favored Kennedy, as they believed he had certain qualities that made him more suitable than Meyer for the role. Kennedy, however, had had no major roles prior to Scream, and Dimension Films, the studio producing the films, was eager to have a more prominent actor in the production alongside the other well-known stars such as Barrymore and Cox. The production team itself, however, was adamant that Kennedy was the best choice and fought successfully to keep him in.

Sidney Prescott

 Portrayed by Neve Campbell
 Appeared in: Scream (1996), Scream 2, Scream 3, Scream 4, Scream (2022)
In Scream, a year after the murder of her mother Maureen, she is stalked by a killer, later revealed to be her boyfriend Billy Loomis and his friend Stu Macher. These two prove to have been Maureen's murderers, Billy being motivated by Maureen's affair with his father, which caused his mother to leave home. Sidney kills both of them in self-defense. In Scream 2, while attending college, she again becomes the target of a masked killer, this time her boyfriend's friend Mickey Altieri and the mother of Billy Loomis, seeking revenge for the death of her son. Once more Sidney manages to survive the attempts on her life. During Scream 3, she is drawn to Hollywood by yet another killer. She discovers that this one is her half-brother Roman Bridger, who wants to kill her out of anger at his abandonment by Maureen. In Scream 4, she returns to Woodsboro to promote her new self-help book about overcoming the tragedies of her life, but is targeted once again by a new Ghostface, who turns out to be her cousin Jill Roberts who is envious of Sidney's fame and wants to become the new "Sidney Prescott". In Scream (2022), Sidney is revealed to be married to Mark Kincaid, whom she first met in Scream 3. They now have two children together. Sidney returns to Woodsboro so that she and Gale can help Sam Carpenter and her sister Tara to kill the new Ghostfaces, avenging Dewey and the other victims. The character does not appear in Scream VI, but Gale Weathers states that Sidney and her husband, Mark, have gone into hiding with their children in response to the latest killings in New York.

In the fictional films within a film Stab and Stab 2, based on the murders, Sidney is portrayed by Tori Spelling as herself. In Stab 3: Return to Woodsboro, she would be portrayed by fictional actress Angelina Tyler; however, Angelina is killed by Ghostface.

Neve Campbell won the Saturn Award for Best Actress in 1997 for her role as Sidney Prescott in Scream and the MTV Movie Award for Best Female Performance in 1998 for her role in Scream 2. When she was cast in Scream, Campbell was starring in the television drama series Party of Five. It was previously unheard of to cast an established television actress in a horror film, but, following the success of this casting and that of Courteney Cox, the practice became common in many later horror films. Craven opined that their presence helped raise the profile of Scream and attract a large female audience.

Steve Orth
 Portrayed by Kevin Patrick Walls
 Appeared in: Scream
Steven "Steve" Orth is a Woodsboro teenager and the boyfriend of Casey Becker. He is captured and held hostage by Ghostface, who keeps him bound to a chair outside Casey's home. Casey is made to answer horror-film trivia questions to save his life. When she gets a question wrong, Steve is disemboweled and dies.

Walls auditioned for the part of Billy Loomis, but took the smaller role of Steve when Ulrich was cast as Billy.

Stu Macher
 Portrayed by Matthew Lillard
 Appeared in: Scream, Scream VI (photo only)
Stuart "Stu" Macher is a Woodsboro teenager, the ex-boyfriend of Casey Becker and boyfriend of Tatum Riley. Following a series of murders in the town, starting with the killing of Stu's ex-girlfriend Casey Becker, school is suspended. Stu hosts a party at his house to celebrate. At the party, Ghostface murders Tatum. Billy Loomis is revealed to be Ghostface, and Stu his accomplice. Stu cites peer pressure as his motivation. Stu tries to kill Sidney, but she drops a television on his head, electrocuting him. In Scream 3, it is revealed that, under Roman Bridger's advice, Billy was planned to set Stu up as the "fall guy" for their killing spree in case they got caught, while him getting an easy sentencing for being an accomplice.

Matthew Lillard has an uncredited cameo at a sorority party in Scream 2. He revealed in a 2009 interview that Stu was originally intended to be the killer in Scream 3, having survived his apparent death. From prison he was to orchestrate new Ghostface attacks on high school students, ultimately targeting Sidney. Following the Columbine High School massacre, which took place shortly before production began, this plot was abandoned and the script was rewritten without Stu to avoid presenting violence and murder in a high school setting. Many of Lillard's notable and humorous lines in the film were improvised. He was cast by chance, after accompanying his girlfriend at the time to a separate audition in the facility where Scream auditions were also taking place. Scream casting director Lisa Beach saw Lillard and, believing he had the characteristics required of the character, asked him to audition. Lillard also subsequently made vocal cameos in Scream 3 and Scream (2022) as the voice of Ghostface respectively using a voice changer and in the film within a film Stab 8, and appearing again as a background partygoer in Scream 4 and Scream (2022), complimenting Amber on the Machers house and participating in the "To Wes!" toast in the latter.

Stu’s photo can be seen on the investigation board in Scream VI. Also Stu’s red robe worn at the end of the first film and the TV used to kill him can be seen in shrine to Ghostface/Stab. Kirby Reed uses the same TV to kill Ethan.

Tatum Riley

 Portrayed by Rose McGowan
 Appeared in: Scream
Tatum Riley is a Woodsboro teenager, the best friend of Sidney Prescott, the girlfriend of Stu Macher and the sister of town Deputy Dewey Riley. After a series of murders begin in the town, Tatum attempts to protect Sidney from the ensuing media attention, since the killings occurred on the anniversary of the brutal murder of Sidney's mother. Tatum's boyfriend Stu hosts a house party, during which the killer strikes, attacking her in the garage. She tries to escape through a pet flap fitted to the automatic garage door, but becomes stuck, and the killer raises the door. Tatum's neck is crushed between the rising door and the top of its frame, killing her.

Twenty-five years after her death, her older brother Dewey is shown in possession of her ashes in his trailer.

Tatum's death, like those of Casey Becker and Kenny Brown, caused conflict between director Wes Craven and the MPAA film rating board. Craven was ultimately forced to reduce any lingering shots of her body, necessitating a quick visual cutaway once she dies. Actresses Melinda Clarke and Rebecca Gayheart also auditioned for the role. McGowan was cast as Tatum because the production team felt she best embodied the "spunky" nature of the character. While filming Tatum's death scene, McGowan discovered she actually could fit through the pet flap and as a result, she would fall out of it during filming. The producer had to staple her clothes to the flap to prevent her from falling out of it again.

Introduced in Scream 2

Scream 2 is the second film in the Scream series and is set one year after the Woodsboro murder spree. Sidney Prescott and Randy Meeks now attend the fictional Windsor College as students. "Stab", a film based on the Woodsboro murders, has just been released, and a copycat murder spree begins during its premiere. The new Ghostface attacks Sidney and her friends, killing Randy and wounding Dewey Riley, before being revealed as Sidney's classmate Mickey Altieri and Nancy Loomis, the mother of Scream killer Billy Loomis.

Cici Cooper
 Portrayed by Sarah Michelle Gellar
 Appeared in: Scream 2
Casey "Cici" Cooper is a student at Windsor College. While alone in her house, Cici is attacked by Ghostface. She runs upstairs pursued by the killer, who throws her through a glass door on to a balcony and stabs her twice in the back before picking her up and throwing her over the balcony to her death. From her murder and the preceding murders of Phil Stevens and Maureen Evans, Gale Weathers and Dewey Riley deduce that the new killer is choosing targets with names similar to those of the victims of the original Ghostface killers, Billy Loomis and Stu Macher.

Nancy Loomis

 Portrayed by Laurie Metcalf
 Appeared in: Scream 2, Scream VI (photo only)
Debbie Salt is the pseudonym of Nancy Loomis, referred to simply as "Billy's mother" and "Mrs. Loomis" in the film. She is a local news reporter covering the series of murders at Windsor College. In the finale, Salt is revealed to be Billy's mother, and the copycat Ghostface alongside her accomplice, Mickey. Before the events of Scream, she leaves her home after learning of her husband's affair with Sidney Prescott's mother Maureen, abandoning Billy and providing his motivation for his killing spree in Scream. After Billy's death Mrs. Loomis undertakes a physical makeover, losing weight to change her appearance. She then recruits Mickey from a website devoted to serial killers, to enact a plan for revenge against Sidney. She ultimately betrays Mickey and shoots him, claiming to have indulged his desire for fame to gain his help, while she really intends to kill Sidney and then disappear without trace. Cotton Weary intervenes and manages to save Sidney's life by shooting Nancy in the chest, before Sidney shoots her through the head, to guarantee that she won't return.

In the original Scream 2 script, Nancy worked with Hallie and Derek, not Mickey, though she still killed her allies. She intended to frame Cotton for the murders, but he managed to stab and kill her. After the script leaked on to the Internet, it underwent rewrites that removed this ending. In Scream VI, Mrs. Loomis' first name is revealed to have been "Nancy", listed on Kirby Reed's FBI list of previous killers with their photo and death year.

Derek Feldman
 Portrayed by Jerry O'Connell
 Appeared in: Scream 2
Derek Feldman is a pre-med student at Windsor College, a friend of Mickey and boyfriend of Sidney Prescott. After publicly declaring his love for Sidney, he is captured by his fellow frat brothers and restrained as a prank. During the finale, as Sidney is escaping Ghostface, she finds Derek still restrained and tries to untie him before the killer arrives. Ghostface reveals himself as Mickey and accuses Derek of being his accomplice, causing Sidney to hesitate in freeing him. After Derek threatens Mickey, Mickey shoots him through the heart, killing him.

In the original Scream 2 screenplay, Derek was one of the killers working with Mrs. Loomis and Hallie McDaniel. He and Hallie, who were also secret lovers, shared the motivation of gaining fame for the murders when they were caught, but were both killed by Mrs. Loomis to preserve her anonymity. After the script was leaked on the Internet, it underwent rewrites, removing this ending.

Hallie McDaniel
 Portrayed by Elise Neal
 Appeared in: Scream 2
Hallie McDaniel is a psychology major at Windsor College and the roommate of Sidney Prescott. She is also sworn to the Delta Lambda Zeta sorority. When Sidney is taken into protective custody, Hallie accompanies her, but Ghostface attacks the car in which they are traveling and murders the policemen guarding them. Ghostface hijacks their car, but crashes, rendering himself unconscious and allowing Sidney and Hallie to escape. When Sidney returns to the vehicle to discover the killer's identity, she finds him missing from the car. Ghostface leaps out at Hallie as she waits nearby for Sidney, and stabs her to death.

In the original Scream 2 screenplay, Hallie was one of the killers, working with Mrs. Loomis and Derek Feldman. She and Derek, who were also secret lovers, shared the motivation of gaining fame for the murders when they were caught, but were both killed by Mrs. Loomis to preserve her anonymity. After the script was leaked on the Internet, it underwent rewrites, removing this ending.

Joel Jones
 Portrayed by Duane Martin
 Appeared in: Scream 2
Joel Jones is Gale Weathers' new cameraman, replacing Kenny Brown from Scream.

When the Windsor College murders begin, Joel becomes scared of Gale's need to follow the trail. After he reads her book "The Woodsboro Murders", he becomes even more reluctant, especially when he learns about the fate of Kenny and greatly dislikes it when anybody mentions his name in front of him. He goes to buy some doughnuts and coffee and is shocked to come back and find Randy Meeks murdered in his van, passing out once he sees the gruesome sight. Left without his van due to it being an official crime scene and finally being pushed to his limits following Randy's death, he leaves, giving Gale all of the news footage that they had filmed so far and telling her that she needed her "head examined".

At the end of the film, he returns to Gale to once again be her cameraman.

In the original Scream 2 screenplay, Joel had a larger role as a member of Sidney Prescott's group of friends. His corpse was found during the film's finale. After this script was leaked on the Internet, it underwent rewrites, changing the role of several characters and making Joel a cameraman.

Maureen Evans and Phil Stevens
 Portrayed by Jada Pinkett and Omar Epps, respectively
 Appeared in: Scream 2
Maureen Evans and her boyfriend Phil Stevens are students at Windsor College. They attend a sneak preview of the film "Stab", during which Phil goes to the bathroom and hears strange whimpering from the next stall. He presses his ear against the divider to listen closer, but a blade is forced through the divider, stabbing Phil in the ear and killing him. The killer, wearing a Ghostface costume, returns to the screening and sits beside Maureen, before mortally stabbing her. The audience believe her to be part of a publicity stunt, until she falls dead in front of the cinema screen.

Their deaths are satirized in Scary Movie.

Mickey Altieri
 Portrayed by Timothy Olyphant
 Appeared in: Scream 2, Scream VI (photo only)
Mickey Altieri is a student at Windsor College and Derek's best friend. Like Randy Meeks from Scream, he shows an avid interest in horror films and sequels. In the finale he is revealed as the current Ghostface, with his accomplice Mrs. Loomis. He kills Sidney's boyfriend Derek in front of her. Mickey states that he carried out the killings with the intention of getting caught, believing he would receive fame for his deeds and from the resulting trial, and intending to blame film violence for influencing him. Contrary to Mickey's desires, however, Mrs. Loomis intends to disappear after the killings; so she shoots him, seemingly fatally. After Mrs. Loomis' defeat, though, Mickey leaps to his feet to attack Sidney, but is finally killed by Gale and Sidney.

In the original Scream 2 script, Mickey was murdered by Ghostface while trying to save Sidney, but this was changed in rewrites after the original script was leaked online.

Scream VI sees a new Ghostface in NYC who attacks the remaining four survivors from the previous film. The new killer is leaving masks worn by past Ghostfaces. After an attack at Sam and Tara’s apartment the killer leaves the mask used by Mickey and Mrs. Loomis. Later on a photo of Mickey and all the other past killers can be seen while Kirby Reed (now FBI) is investigating.

Stab Casey Becker
 Portrayed by Heather Graham
 Appeared in: Scream 2, Scream 4 (archive footage), Scream (2022) (photo only)
Stab Casey Becker is the movie version of Casey Becker, portrayed by Drew Barrymore. She takes a shower while making popcorn. She also does not have a boyfriend, unlike her real-life counterpart. In the fourth film, Gale is attacked at Stab-A-Thon as the Woodsboro High teenagers watch the famed Stab opening scene, quoting her lines of dialogue. In the fifth film, Tara sees Heather Graham's image on her QuickSearch results when drilled with a movie trivia question by Ghostface. She identifies Heather Graham as the actress who portrays Casey (a fictionalised version of herself).

Film Class Guy #1
 Portrayed by Joshua Jackson
 Appeared in: Scream 2
Joshua Jackson is a film student at Windsor College, in class with Randy Meeks, Mickey Altieri, and Cici Cooper. Credited as Film Class Guy #1, the character was retroactively established to be a fictionalised version of the actor Joshua Jackson in Scream (2022).

Introduced in Scream 3

In Scream 3, the third film in the Scream series, a new series of Ghostface murders begins during production of "Stab 3", a film within a film based on the murders in Scream and Scream 2. Sidney Prescott has hidden herself away, and Ghostface leaves photographs of a young Maureen Prescott, her mother, at the crime scenes, hoping to lure her to Hollywood. The killer is revealed as Roman Bridger, Sidney's unknown half-brother and Maureen's son. Roman was conceived after the young Maureen was gang-raped in Hollywood while attempting to become an actress under the pseudonym Rina Reynolds. Baby Roman was given up for adoption, but as an adult he found Maureen, who rejected him. In revenge for this, Roman convinced Billy Loomis to kill her. Sidney and Roman fight, and Sidney stabs him before Dewey Riley shoots him through the head and kills him.

Angelina Tyler
 Portrayed by Emily Mortimer
 Appeared in: Scream 3
Angelina Tyler is the actress who plays the role of Sidney Prescott in "Stab 3". To win this role, she took part in a talent competition, but she later reveals that she had sex with John Milton, the producer of the "Stab" films, to secure the job. While attending the birthday party of Roman Bridger, she is attacked and killed by Ghostface.

In the original cut of the film, Angelina was a second Ghostface, Roman's lover and accomplice, with the original draft elaborating that she was a former classmate of Sidney from Woodsboro, whose real name was Angie Crick. Her motivation was stated as her idolizing Sidney and wanting her fame and attention, thus taking on the role of Sidney in the "Stab" film, and giving Roman's and Sidney's relationship incestuous vibes. The idea was later apparently scrapped; however, in the film's director's commentary, Craven confirmed that Angelina was still portrayed as the second killer in the final film, but that the scenes revealing her relationship with Roman (and having captured Milton in order for Roman to execute him) had been cut; Craven elaborated that an earlier scene in the film where Sidney came across Angelina wearing Ghostface gear in her dressing room, which she had passed off as having been taking souvenirs from the set, was Sidney unknowingly having actually caught Angelina in the act of changing into her Ghostface gear. Craven furthermore left it ambiguous as to whether Angelina was actually dead (due to her "murder" having occurred offscreen), or whether Roman had betrayed and killed her while she was "wandering off" to get changed into her Ghostface gear. Editor Patrick Lussier also discussed the idea in the commentary.

In a subsequent Scream Trilogy DVD boxset booklet, Angelina is not listed as a deceased character from Scream 3. This may have just been an oversight, but fans have speculated it is connected to all this other information about the plan to have her as a killer.

Christine Hamilton
 Portrayed by Kelly Rutherford
 Appeared in: Scream 3
Christine Hamilton is Cotton Weary's girlfriend. In the opening of Scream 3, she is stalked by the current Ghostface, who uses a voice synthesizer to sound like Cotton, convincing her that Cotton is behind the mask. When the real Cotton arrives, she believes him to be Ghostface and attacks him, while the real Ghostface approaches her from behind and stabs her to death.

Jennifer Jolie

 Portrayed by Parker Posey
 Appeared in: Scream 3, Scream (2022) (photo only)
Jennifer Jolie (real name Judy Jurgenstern) is the actress playing the role of Gale Weathers in the first two Stab movies, and the cancelled Stab 3: Return to Woodsboro. After a new series of Ghostface murders, Jennifer believes she may be the next victim and starts following the real Gale, hoping the killer will choose to kill her instead. While attending a birthday party for Roman Bridger she is attacked and killed by Ghostface. In the fifth film, Tara sees an image of Jennifer when she uses QuickSearch to find the cast of the original Stab.

Parker Posey was nominated in 2000 for an MTV Movie Award for Best Comedic Performance for her role as Jennifer Jolie, losing to Adam Sandler, who won it for his performance in Big Daddy (1999).

John Milton
 Portrayed by Lance Henriksen
 Appeared in: Scream 3
John Milton is the producer of the three fictional "Stab" movies. He is revealed to have known Maureen Prescott in her youth, when she was an aspiring actress using the pseudonym Rina Reynolds. It was during one of Milton's parties in the 1970s that Rina was gang-raped and became pregnant with Roman Bridger, with Milton himself being his father, making him an overall catalyst of the Ghostface killing sprees. Ghostface, revealed as Roman, kidnaps Milton and murders him in front of Sidney, blaming his father for turning their mother into a "slut".

Mark Kincaid
 Portrayed by Patrick Dempsey
 Appeared in: Scream 3
Mark Kincaid is a detective investigating the most recent Ghostface murders. He displays an interest in horror films, and in the history of Sidney Prescott. When Sidney is forced to confront the killer, Kincaid is concerned for her and secretly follows her. Kincaid is attacked and severely wounded by Ghostface. After Ghostface is killed, he is seen with Sidney, Dewey and Gale at Sidney's house, preparing to watch a movie.

In the fifth film of the franchise, Sidney is married and has children with a man named Mark, which directors Tyler Gillett and Matt Bettinelli-Olpin later confirmed was in fact Mark Kincaid. He is mentioned again in Scream VI, where it's stated Sidney and him have gone into hiding with their kids in response to the most recent killings in New York.

Martha Meeks
 Portrayed by Heather Matarazzo
 Appeared in: Scream 3, Scream (2022)
Martha Meeks is Randy Meeks' younger sister, four years his junior. After learning of the new Ghostface murders, she sneaks onto the Stab 3: Return to Woodsboro set to give Dewey Riley a tape recorded by Randy prior to his death in Scream 2; it contains his advice for surviving the concluding chapter of a trilogy and the third series of Ghostface murders. She is surprised to find Sidney, now out of hiding, there alongside the former deputy.

In the DVD commentary, Marianne Maddalena stated that a line reference to Martha being in Hollywood for a game show was deleted, explaining how she bypassed security on the set.

In Scream (2022), Martha is the 39-year-old mother to fraternal twin children: Chad and Mindy Meeks-Martin. Both children are high school seniors, suggesting she became a mother at 21. She leaves snacks for the kids to discuss the new killings, and reunites with Dewey for the first time on-screen since the third film after telling him "Bye Dewey, come visit us soon". She appears speechless at his unkempt appearance, before Chad signals her to leave. Later, a text message sent by Chad reveals he text Liv that he snuck out of his mother's house behind her back.

Roman Bridger
 Portrayed by Scott Foley
 Appeared in: Scream 3, Scream VI (photo only)
Roman Bridger is the director of "Stab 3: Return to Woodsboro". During his birthday party at John Milton's mansion, he is found in the basement, apparently murdered. Later, when Sidney Prescott is confronted by Ghostface, the latter is unmasked as Roman, who has faked his death to eliminate himself as a suspect. Roman tells Sidney that he is her half-brother, relating the circumstances of his conception by Milton (who is unaware that Roman is his son) and later rejection by Maureen Prescott and how he had convinced Billy Loomis to murder Maureen, thus making him the overall architect of the Ghostface murders. Believing that Sidney has the life and fame that he was denied, Roman now tries to kill her, but in the end he himself is killed by Dewey Riley.

In Scream VI the new Ghostface is leaving behind masks from past killers. After Dr. Stone is murdered in his home, Ghostface leaves Bridger’s mask used in the third film. While Detective Bailey and Kirby are investigating, they have all of the killers photos on a board with when they died and which mask was left where. Roman’s picture can be seen above “Death: 2000”.

Sarah Darling
 Portrayed by Jenny McCarthy
 Appeared in: Scream 3
Sarah Darling is an actress starring in "Stab 3". She receives a phone call from someone claiming to be Roman Bridger (later revealed to actually be him), the director of that film, but after the call turns sinister she attempts to conceal herself among a set of film prop Ghostface costumes. However, one of the costumes is being worn by the killer, who attacks and murders Sarah, leaving a picture of the young Maureen Prescott on her corpse.

Steven Stone
 Portrayed by Patrick Warburton
 Appeared in: Scream 3
Steven Stone is Jennifer Jolie's bodyguard. While guarding her home, he inspects Dewey Riley's trailer, which is kept on her land. While there he receives a phone call from someone claiming to be Dewey, who is later revealed to be Ghostface using a voice synthesizer to imitate Dewey's voice. Stone is attacked and killed by Ghostface.

Tom Prinze
 Portrayed by Matt Keeslar
 Appeared in: Scream 3
Tom Prinze is an actor in Stab 3, playing the role of Dewey Riley. At night in Jennifer Jolie's house, Tom, Jennifer, Dewey and Gale Weathers are attacked by Ghostface. The killer begins faxing them pages of script detailing the immediate events. As there is a power cut in the house, Tom attempts to illuminate the pages with his lighter, unaware of gas leaking into the house, causing an explosion that kills him.

Tyson Fox
 Portrayed by Deon Richmond
 Appeared in: Scream 3
Tyson Fox is an actor in Stab 3, playing the role of Ricky, the Stab 3 equivalent of Randy Meeks, following backlash of his death in Stab 2. While attending the birthday party of Roman Bridger, he is attacked, stabbed, and thrown over a balcony to his death.

Introduced in Scream 4

Scream 4 is the fourth film in the Scream series. On the fifteenth anniversary of the Woodsboro massacre depicted in Scream, Sidney Prescott returns to the town to promote her new self-help book, "Out of Darkness", about her overcoming the attacks and the deaths in her life. The fictional "Stab" series of horror films based on her life have continued to be produced and have become increasingly popular. In Scream 4, Woodsboro is attacked by a new Ghostface, who recreates the original Woodsboro killings from Scream. Ghostface targets Sidney, her cousin Jill Roberts, and Jill's friends. As the killings occur, Gale Weathers-Riley struggles to reestablish her journalistic career, while working on her strained marriage to Dewey Riley, now promoted to Sheriff.

Anthony Perkins
 Portrayed by Anthony Anderson
 Appeared in: Scream 4
Deputy Anthony Perkins (credited simply as "Deputy Perkins") is a member of the Woodsboro police, who is assigned to guard Jill Roberts, Kirby Reed and Sidney Prescott after threats from Ghostface. While patrolling the grounds of Jill's home, he and his partner are attacked and stabbed to death by Ghostface. Perkins pulls a prank on Hoss, before Hoss is stabbed from behind, then Perkins is stabbed in the head. Hoss refers to him as "Anthony" when he plays dead, a nod to actor Anthony Perkins, who portrayed Norman Bates in Psycho (1960).

Shortly before he drops to his death, he is still living, despite being impaled in the skull with a knife; this was based on a real-life story that Wes Craven heard about, from a man who took himself to the E.R after being stabbed in the head.

Anderson replaces Rutina Wesley who was intended to portray Marcie Perkins until budget cuts prevented it.

Deputy Hoss
 Portrayed by Adam Brody
 Appeared in: Scream 4
Deputy Hoss (forename unknown) is a "rookie" member of the Woodsboro police, who is assigned to guard Jill Roberts, Kirby Reed and Sidney Prescott after threats from Ghostface. While patrolling the grounds of Jill's home, he and his partner are attacked and stabbed to death by Ghostface, after his partner Perkins pulls a prank on him. His wife is pregnant with his child at the time of his death.

Charlie Walker
 Portrayed by Rory Culkin
 Appeared in: Scream 4, Scream VI (photo only)
Charles "Charlie" Walker is a student at Woodsboro High School, friend of Robbie Mercer, love interest of Kirby Reed and an avid fan of horror films, particularly the "Stab" series. He runs a film club with Robbie, and the pair are recruited by Gale Weathers-Riley to help profile the killer. He hosts a large-scale viewing of the seven "Stab" films in a remote area, and later attends an after-party at Kirby's house. Ghostface attacks the party and Charlie is captured and bound to a chair. Kirby is forced to answer horror film trivia questions to save his life. Believing she has won, Kirby frees Charlie, but he stabs her in the stomach and confesses to being the killer, angry with her for not returning his affections in the years they had known each other, before leaving her for dead. Charlie is revealed to have an accomplice, Jill Roberts, with whom he is in a romantic relationship. Charlie admits to aiding Jill in order to become the new generation Randy Meeks to her Sidney Prescott. Jill instead betrays him and stabs him through the heart, killing him.

12 years later, Kirby is an FBI agent and visits New York where the latest Ghostface has struck. She shows her wounds Charlie gave her from her attack and later can be seen observing the knife used on her in the Stab shrine. Also a photo of Walker and all other killers can be seen while Reed is investigating with Detective Bailey.

Jenny Randall
 Portrayed by Aimee Teegarden 
 Appeared in: Scream 4
Jenny Randall is a student at Woodsboro High. After watching Stab 7, Jenny pranks Marnie by pretending to be Ghostface. However, Marnie is then attacked and killed by the real Ghostface. Ghostface calls Jenny, taunting her, and Jenny assumes it is Trevor, Jill's ex-boyfriend, suggesting a connection between the two. The killer then chases Jenny through the house, wounding her and crushing her back as she tries to crawl under an automatic garage door, before stabbing her to death.

The next day, Jill gets a call from Jenny's phone in front of Olivia and Kirby, using the Ghostface voice. At Sidney's book signing, the knife used to kill her makes Sidney a material witness to the crime, as Jenny and Marnie's phones are found in Sidney's rental. The film highlights Trevor's infidelity and a small suggestion is Trevor may have cheated on Jill with Jenny. When Jill is revealed as the killer, she expresses rage over Trevor cheating on her.

The PPV version of the film released to streaming in some countries re-dubs some of Olivia's lines, calling Jenny "the other woman" in the car on the way to school, making her murder much more obvious in how personal it may have been.

Wes Craven expressed disappointment in the removal of Jenny and Marnie's crime scene aftermath/autopsy scene, which was to occur sometime after the title card appeared. In the scene, the Woodsboro remake theme became apparent. The scene features Sheriff Dewey Riley (David Arquette), Deputy Sheriff Judy Hicks (Marley Shelton), the other cops and Craven himself in a coroner cameo, discussing leads, bodily fluid samples, the murder weapon, and explanations for why the girls were home alone. Jenny is tied to a chair like Steven Orth, while Marnie's corpse is hung to the ceiling fan like Casey Becker (Drew Barrymore) is hung from the tree in the original opening scene.

The deletion was administered by Bob Weinstein for pacing reasons. While Craven was susceptible to other deleted scenes, he felt the removal of this scene made the remake theme less apparent. Craven further stated, "For whatever reason he felt it wasn't important or necessary. We argued a long time for it. Our working relationship is give and take. He technically has final cut."

Marnie Cooper
 Portrayed by Britt Robertson 
 Appeared in: Scream 4
Marnie Cooper is the shyer, more reserved best friend of Jenny. She is a student at Woodsboro High, who is critical of Stab 6 and Stab 7 due to the movie-within-a-movie format seeming illogical. She is the audience surrogate in order for viewers to be explained by Jenny what the fake-out openings meant. When Jenny claims to hear a noise, Marnie immediately suspects she is about to prank her, a regular occurrence. When she comes upstairs, Jenny calls Marnie in the Ghostface voice through an app, and scares her, before she reveals it is her speaking through an app. However, Marnie croaks, and the phone shuts off, indicating something has happened to her.

Jenny investigates. Her window is smashed open, and Marnie's corpse falls through, and Jenny is killed moments later. The next day, unbeknown that she has died, Olivia Morris refers to her as "Marnie the Carnie" when she tells Jill that she got a call from her earlier in the morning using the Ghostface voice, indicating animosity between the two. At Sidney's book signing, the knife used to kill her makes Sidney a material witness to the crime, as Jenny and Marnie's phones are found in Sidney's rental. The climax reveals Charlie killed her, and shows footage of Marnie's stabbing to Sidney. The stabbing scene is the first time a character's death is shown, after they are murdered. The scene is from the original shot opening where Marnie is the primary target in the attack, not Jenny, after Jenny is stabbed on the couch and Marnie assumes it is a prank. The scene was available for viewing on the DVD for Scream 4.

A crime scene aftermath scene was shot and famously photographed as a promotional image for the film in 2010. It depicts Marnie hung from a ceiling fan at the Randall household, where the cops photograph the crime scene. Dewey asks them to take Marnie's corpse down. Later, Judy Hicks provides an explanation for why they are home-alone, with Marnie's parents assuming Jenny's parents were at home, while they were away. Against director Wes Craven's wishes, Bob Weinstein who had greater creative power, deleted the scene in the editing room, which was critical to highlight the remake theme. Craven expressed disappointment with this decision, arguing with Weinstein about it. He stated that the remake "was a huge theme" that was sadly "minimized throughout the editing process".

Jill Roberts

 Portrayed by Emma Roberts
 Appeared in: Scream 4, Scream VI (photo only)
Jill Roberts is a student at Woodsboro High School, cousin of Sidney Prescott and Roman Bridger, the daughter of Kate Roberts, and the niece of Maureen and Neil Prescott. Before the events of the film, she ends her relationship with her boyfriend Trevor Sheldon after he cheats on her. She and her friends, Kirby Reed and Olivia Morris, are targeted by the new Ghostface, resulting in their gaining police protection. Jill sneaks away from the protection to Kirby's house for a party. Ghostface attacks the party, murdering some of the attendees before being revealed as Charlie Walker. Following this reveal, Jill reveals herself as the other Ghostface and the mastermind behind the murders, as she and Charlie capture Sidney.

Envious of Sidney's fame, Jill wants to become the new "Sidney Prescott" by recreating the events that made Sidney famous. Jill murders Trevor for cheating on her, betrays Charlie by stabbing him through the heart, and stabs Sidney in the stomach. Believing that the witnesses to her crimes are all dead, Jill plants evidence framing Trevor and Charlie for the murder spree. Jill then intentionally harms herself to appear to be the lone survivor of the Ghostface attacks. After being taken to the hospital, Jill discovers that Sidney has survived her wounds. Jill again attempts to kill Sidney, but Sidney, aided by Dewey Riley, Gale Weathers-Riley and Judy Hicks, shoots Jill in the chest, killing her.

Jill’s photo can be seen on an investigation board as Kirby (now FBI) and Detective Bailey investigate the new Ghostface killer (Scream VI). The new killer also leaves behind old masks used in past killings and the one used by Jill & Charlie gets left after Sam & Tara are attacked at a bodega. Jill’s outfit she wore while at Kirby’s in the final act can be seen in the Stab shrine.

Ashley Greene was considered for the role of Jill before Emma Roberts was cast.

Judy Hicks

 Portrayed by Marley Shelton
 Appeared in: Scream 4, Scream (2022)
Judy Hicks is Deputy Sheriff of Woodsboro under Sheriff Dewey Riley and a former classmate of Sidney Prescott. She idolizes Dewey but dislikes his wife Gale Weathers-Riley. The two are able to put aside their differences in the end, when Judy saves Gale from being shot by Jill Roberts. She is then shot herself, but is unharmed, as she is wearing a bulletproof vest.

In the fifth entry, Judy is promoted to Sheriff. Her son, Wes Hicks, is introduced (a name tribute to series veteran director Wes Craven who died in 2015), portrayed by Dylan Minnette. She is subsequently murdered along with Wes at her home.

A deleted scene for Scream 5 reunited Woodsboro cops, Dewey and Judy in person for Scream 5, but it was cut to give Arquette's character a better introduction and for the audience to spend more time with the newer characters.

Lake Bell was given the role of Judy, but she dropped out only four days before filming was to begin, citing scheduling conflicts. Hicks is Shelton's first role she has been asked to reprise, and she is also the first sequel performer to star in another sequel.

Kate Roberts
 Portrayed by Mary McDonnell
 Appeared in: Scream 4
Kate Roberts is the mother of Jill Roberts, aunt to Sidney Prescott, sister to Maureen Prescott, and the sister-in-law of Neil Prescott. After Kate and Sidney are attacked by Ghostface, Kate, leaning against a door, is stabbed in the back through a mail slot and dies.

Lauren Graham was originally cast in the role of Kate Roberts but left the production a few days into principal photography, being replaced with McDonnell.

Kirby Reed

 Portrayed by Hayden Panettiere
 Appeared in: Scream 4, Scream (2022) (photograph only), Scream VI
Kirby Reed is a Woodsboro teenager, friend of Jill Roberts and Olivia Morris, love interest of Charlie Walker and an avid fan of horror films. While entertaining friends at a party, she begins to pursue Charlie romantically. Ghostface attacks the party and she retreats into the basement with Sidney. Ghostface captures Charlie and forces Kirby to play a game to save his life. When she believes she has won, she unties Charlie, who then stabs her in the stomach and reveals that he is the killer, blaming her because she had not returned his affections sooner. After Scream 4, she became a fan favorite and a frequent topic of debate as to whether or not she survived her stabbings.

In Scream (2022), a visual clue reveals that Kirby survived her injuries and participated in an interview about the attacks, making her the sole survivor of the 2011 killing spree, although her whereabouts are unknown. In May 2022, Panettiere officially signed on to be a cast member in the upcoming 2023 film Scream VI, indicating Kirby's return.

In Scream VI, Kirby returns as an FBI agent investigating the latest Ghostface killings in New York City. She is revealed to have known Sam when they were both in high school, Sam having been a freshman when Kirby was a senior.

Olivia Morris
 Portrayed by Marielle Jaffe
 Appeared in: Scream 4
Olivia Morris is a Woodsboro teenager and a friend of Jill Roberts and Kirby Reed. Following a new series of Ghostface murders, she is attacked by Ghostface in her home and disemboweled while her friends are forced to watch from the neighboring house.

Rebecca Walters
 Portrayed by Alison Brie
 Appeared in: Scream 4
Rebecca Walters is Sidney Prescott's secretary and publicist, who helps arrange Sidney's visit to Woodsboro to promote her book. Sidney fires her after Rebecca attempts to capitalize on the new Ghostface murders to increase sales of Sidney's book. While returning to her car, Rebecca is taunted and attacked by Ghostface. She is stabbed to death and her body is thrown from the top of a parking garage, landing on a news van in front of a crowd of reporters.

Robbie Mercer
 Portrayed by Erik Knudsen
 Appeared in: Scream 4
Robert "Robbie" Mercer is a Woodsboro teenager, a friend of Charlie Walker and an avid fan of horror films, running a film club with Charlie. While attending Kirby Reed's party, he is attacked by Ghostface and fatally wounded, living long enough to warn Sidney Prescott, Jill and Kirby before dying.

Trevor Sheldon
 Portrayed by Nico Tortorella
 Appeared in: Scream 4
Trevor Sheldon is a Woodsboro teenager and the ex-boyfriend of Jill Roberts, who ended her relationship with him after he took her virginity and then cheated on her with Jenny Randall. He makes repeated attempts to earn her forgiveness and continue their relationship. After Ghostface's victims receive calls from Trevor's cellphone, which he claims to have lost, he becomes a suspect in the murders. He attends Kirby Reed's house party, claiming to have been invited by phone, but the guests deny responsibility. When the true Ghostface killers are unmasked as Charlie Walker and Jill, they reveal a bound Trevor, whom they plan to frame for their crimes. Jill shoots him in the crotch for cheating on her, before executing him by shooting him in the head.

Tortorella auditioned five times to secure the role of Trevor by reenacting a scene from Scream where the character of Billy Loomis reveals he is one of the killers.

Introduced in Scream (2022)

Sam Carpenter
 Portrayed by Melissa Barrera
 Appeared in: Scream (2022), Scream VI

Samantha "Sam" Carpenter is a young woman from Woodsboro who now lives in Modesto, California with her boyfriend, Richie Kirsch. She is the older sister of Tara Carpenter, and former babysitter of Wes Hicks. After discovering her real father is Billy Loomis when she was thirteen, Sam had a troubled adolescence before leaving her family and Woodsboro at eighteen, fearing that she would become a psychotic killer since. Upon receiving a call from Wes about Tara's attack, Sam returns to Woodsboro after five years with Richie to be with Tara as she recovers. At the hospital, she is attacked by Ghostface and begins experiencing hallucinations of her father. She eventually tells Tara her secret, which creates tension between the two. After rescuing Tara from a second attack, Sam decides to leave for Modesto again with both Richie and Tara. When Tara realizes she is missing her inhaler, the trio stops at Amber's house to retrieve a spare. There, Richie stabs her, revealing himself to be one of the killers alongside Amber and Tara's attacker. He tries to kill Sam but she overpowers him and kills him by slitting his throat. She then thanks Sidney and Gale before leaving for the hospital with Tara.

Richie Kirsch
 Portrayed by Jack Quaid
 Appeared in: Scream (2022), Scream VI
Richard Bailey, professionally known as Richie Kirsch, is introduced in Scream (2022) as Sam Carpenter's boyfriend and coworker of six months at a bowling alley in Modesto, California. When she learns her sister Tara was attacked and hospitalized, he goes with her to Woodsboro for emotional support. After Sam is attacked in the hospital by Ghostface, he overhears her tell Tara she (Sam) is Billy Loomis' illegitimate daughter, but decides to stay with her. He goes with her to seek out Dewey Riley, who warns her that, as her boyfriend, he's high on the list of suspects. He's also there when she speaks to Tara's friends. He later finds Tara being attacked by Ghostface and is mildly injured. Sam and Dewey arrive and, while Richie and the girls escape, Dewey is killed. Afterwards, they meet Sidney and, despite her warnings, decide to leave. On the way out, Tara realizes she lost her inhaler and Sam convinces Richie to go to Amber's house to get her spare. When they learn Ghostface is there, Sam is suspicious of Richie, though he warns her it could be Tara. After Sidney arrives, she and Sam subdue Ghostface, only for Richie to stab Sam, revealing himself as a killer, the other being Amber. They take them and the wounded Gale captive and reveal their plan: to make a real life reboot of "Stab" with Sam, as Billy's daughter, framed as the killer. Richie also stole Tara's inhaler so they would fall into his trap. However, they learn Tara is free (Richie's attempt to sow distrust in Sam failed), distracting them long enough for Sidney and Gale to deal with Amber while Sam fights Richie. She ultimately gets a knife and stabs him many times with it before slitting his throat. She then empties a gun taken from Gale into his corpse to be sure he is dead. In Scream VI, Richie is seen again in footage of his Stab fan film saved by his father Wayne and siblings Quinn and Ethan, who collectively elect to avenge his death as Ghostface, to which Sam taunts them over most of Richie's "victims" having survived their wounds, with the majority to have died having been killed by Amber.

Amber Freeman
 Portrayed by Mikey Madison
 Appeared in: Scream (2022), Scream VI (photo only)
Amber Freeman is a Woodsboro teenager and friend to Tara Carpenter, Wes Hicks, Chad Meeks-Martin, Mindy Meeks-Martin, and Liv McKenzie in Scream (2022). She is seen being threatened by Ghostface during Tara's attack. After Tara's attack, she and the rest of the teenagers go visit her in the hospital along with Tara's older sister Sam and her boyfriend, Richie Kirsch. She and the teenagers are kicked out of a bar, where Liv's summer fling Vince Schneider is killed by Ghostface. After Wes is murdered, she and the teens plan a party at her house to honor his memory. During this, Liv is killed by Amber when she reveals herself as the killer. Amber shoots Gale and Richie reveals himself as her accomplice, taking Gale, Sidney, Sam, and Tara captive. She reveals that they were disappointed at the last Stab movie and wish to revive the franchise with a new killing spree to act as "source material" and break away from the "toxic fandom" label they feel they have unjustly received. Amber is killed after she is shot by Gale and lit on fire, burning alive while screaming, and is subsequently shot in the head by Tara. In Scream VI, Amber is revealed to have committed the majority of murdering victims in Scream (2022), with all but one of Richie's attempts at killing having failed.

Chad Meeks-Martin
 Portrayed by Mason Gooding
 Appears in Scream (2022), Scream VI
Chad Meeks-Martin is a Woodsboro teenager and the fraternal twin brother of Mindy. Through his mother, Martha, he is Randy Meeks's nephew. He is an athlete at Woodsboro High and the boyfriend of Liv McKenzie. He becomes protective of Liv after Vince Schneider tries to get her back one night at the bar. At the memorial party for Wes, he refuses Liv's request to go somewhere private out of fear of going with the killer. Liv storms away and Chad chases after her using location-sharing on his phone. Believing to have found Liv, he is instead attacked by Ghostface. After the killers are stopped, both Chad and Mindy are revealed to have survived and awaiting medical treatment.

Liv McKenzie
 Portrayed by Sonia Ben Ammar
 Appeared in: Scream (2022)
Olivia "Liv" McKenzie is a Woodsboro teenager and the girlfriend of Chad Meeks-Martin. She previously had a summer fling with Vince Schneider. At the memorial party for Wes, Liv becomes angry with Chad over his perceived mistrust of her. She leaves the house and returns later to find his body outside after being attacked. Panicked, she rushes inside to discuss the killer's identity with the remaining guests. In the ensuing argument, Liv is shot in the head and killed by Amber.

Mindy Meeks-Martin
 Portrayed by Jasmin Savoy Brown
 Appears in Scream (2022), Scream VI
Mindy Meeks-Martin is a Woodsboro teenager and the fraternal twin sister of Chad. Through her mother, Martha, she is Randy Meeks's niece. Like her uncle, she is an avid horror fan. At the memorial party for Wes, she is attacked by Ghostface while watching Stab, mirroring the attack on Randy twenty-five years ago. After the killers are stopped, both Chad and Mindy are revealed to have survived and awaiting medical treatment.

Tara Carpenter
 Portrayed by Jenna Ortega
 Appeared in: Scream (2022), Scream VI
Tara Carpenter is a Woodsboro teenager and the younger sister of Sam Carpenter. Her friend group includes Amber Freeman, Wes Hicks and Chad and Mindy Meeks-Martin. She is the first target of the new Ghostface, though she survives the attack. She admits to being a fan of elevated horror, citing the films Hereditary and The Babadook. Tara is initially excited to see her sister after five years, but grows distant when Sam reveals her biological father is Billy Loomis. After she is attacked again at the hospital, Sam decides to bring Tara back to Modesto with her and Richie. As they leave Woodsboro, Tara realizes she is missing her inhaler, but remembers she left a spare at Amber's house. Upon arriving, Amber ends the memorial party in honor of Wes Hicks and goes with Tara to retrieve the inhaler. After revealing herself to be the killer, Amber ties up Tara in her closet. She is eventually found by Sam, who unties her. After finally shooting a still-burned alive Amber who were rushing at Sidney, Sam and Gale to stab them, Tara is loaded into an ambulance. Requesting that Sam ride with her, the two leave the scene.

Vince Schneider
 Portrayed by Kyle Gallner
 Appeared in: Scream (2022)
Vincent "Vince" Schneider is a resident of Woodsboro and had a summer fling with Liv McKenzie. After spending the night at the bar, he is murdered by Ghostface in a nearby alley, becoming the true first victim. When the group discusses potential suspects at the twins' house, it is revealed that Vince is the nephew of Stu Macher through his mother, Leslie.

Wes Hicks
 Portrayed by Dylan Minnette
 Appears in Scream (2022)
Wes Hicks is a Woodsboro teenager and is also Sheriff Judy Hicks' son. He goes to Woodsboro High and is part of the friend group. He calls Sam and tells her about Tara's attack and is worried that the killer will target him and his mother due to Judy having a part in solving the previous killings. As he is preparing the table for dinner, Wes hears strange noises in the house. He goes to lock the front door for safety but is then attacked by Ghostface. He tries to hold off the knife but the killer forces it through his throat, killing him.

Introduced in Scream VI

Anika Kayoko
 Portrayed by Devyn Nekoda
 Appears in Scream VI

Anika Kayoko is shown to attend Blackmore University and is the girlfriend of Mindy. While being attacked by Ghostface in Sam and Tara’s apartment, Anika is choked and then stabbed in the abdomen before escaping to a bedroom with Mindy and Sam. While trying to escape across a ladder into an adjacent apartment, Ghostface breaks into the room and violently shakes the ladder Anika is trying to cross while Mindy, Sam & Danny try to rescue her. Ghostface manages to shake the ladder enough, causing Anika to violently fall to her death.

Dr. Christopher Stone
 Portrayed by Henry Czerny
 Appears in Scream VI

Dr. Christopher Stone, simply referred to as Dr. Stone, appears as Sam’s therapist who she has been visiting to deal with her traumatic experience in Woodsboro. It is revealed that Sam has been withholding details of her past and when she finally reveals the events that took place and her satisfaction in killing Richie, he is shown to be apprehensive of her and admits that he will have to inform the police of her admission. Stone is then later murdered at his house the following day by Ghostface, who stabs him through the nose and steals Sam’s file from his records.

Danny Brackett
 Portrayed by Josh Segarra
 Appears in Scream VI
Danny Brackett is shown to live in the apartment opposite Sam and Tara. He and Sam are revealed to be in a secret relationship after making out in the hallway. When Sam and her friends are being attacked and chased in the apartment, Danny is able to extend a ladder through his open window over to Sam’s apartment for them to climb over. He manages to help Sam and Mindy climb over, but is unable to save Anika. Danny is then shown on his way to the Ghostface shrine where Sam and Tara plan on luring the killer to then execute him. Sam tells Danny to keep away as she cannot trust him for sure and also doesn’t want him to be hurt. He is then seen at the end of the movie, reuniting with Sam once Ghostface has been stopped.

Ethan Bailey
 Portrayed by Jack Champion
 Appears in Scream VI
Ethan Bailey is shown to be a freshman at Blackmore University and is roommates with Chad Meeks-Martin. After the group are attacked at Sam and Tara’s apartment and Anika is killed, Mindy and Chad suspect Ethan is responsible. However, Ethan swears he was attending class on campus with numerous others, thereby exonerating him. When the group are later trying to board a subway carriage, Mindy and Ethan are cut off from the others and have to wait for the next train to arrive. Mindy keeps her distance from Ethan, still suspicious of his whereabouts from the night before and once they board the next train, keeps clear of him. Mindy is then stabbed by Ghostface, who has followed her on the subway, and Ethan rushes to her aid before calling for help. 

During the finale at the Ghostface shrine, Ethan is later unmasked as one of the killers along with Detective Wayne, who is revealed to be his father and Quinn Bailey, his sister. It's also revealed "Landry" is not even his real surname and that Richie Kirsch was Ethan’s older brother, with the family now seeking revenge on Sam for killing him.

Ethan tries to attack Tara, who is hanging from a railing above, trying to climb up but cannot do so. Tara then manages to arm herself with a knife and drops down, crashing onto Ethan who manages to stab her once before Tara violently stabs him in the mouth, presumably killing him. He is later shown to still be alive but is promptly killed by Kirby Reed, who drops the TV that killed Stu Macher on his head.

Jason Carvey and Greg Bruckner
 Portrayed by Tony Revolori and Thom Newell
 Appears in Scream VI
Jason Carvey is first seen in the opening sequence after revealing himself to be the Ghostface who has just murdered college professor Laura Crane, after catfishing her as "Reggie". It is revealed that Jason, along with his roommate Greg Bruckner, had been planning to finish creating the ‘movie’ that Richie Kirsch set out to make the year previously by killing the Carpenter sisters. After murdering Laura, Jason returns to his apartment where he is taunted by another Ghostface, pretending to be Greg over the phone. Jason is lured to his refrigerator by the new Ghostface, where he discovers Greg’s dismembered body before being brutally stabbed and murdered by Ghostface.

Laura Crane
 Portrayed by Samara Weaving
 Appears in Scream VI
Laura Crane is revealed to be a film professor at Blackmore University in New York City. She is first shown in a bar waiting for an online date, Reggie, to arrive. When Reggie contacts her, looking for directions on how to reach her, she leaves the bar and heads to an empty alleyway where she believes she has found him only for Reggie to reveal himself as Ghostface, who jumps out from the darkness and viciously stabs her to death. Ghostface then unmasks himself to be Jason Carvey, one of Laura’s film students who had plotted to murder her with his friend, Greg, after catfishing her online. Jason later described his pleasure at murdering Laura in great detail to "Greg" on the phone, before finding Greg dead and being murdered by another Ghostface himself.

Quinn Bailey
 Portrayed by Liana Liberato
 Appears in Scream VI
Quinn Bailey is Tara's roommate, who also attends Blackmore University. Her father is Detective Wayne, who she reveals followed her to New York when she begun attending college, after the death of her brother prior. She is shown to be a sex-positive young woman who has numerous male partners over in her apartment. Quinn’s bedroom window looks directly opposite Danny Brackett’s apartment, where he witnesses Ghostface standing over her while she lies in bed on the phone oblivious to her surroundings. Danny tries to alert Quinn and eventually gets through to Sam, who is in the kitchen, when he sends video footage of Ghostface stabbing Quinn. The others in the apartment then gather in the living room where Quinn’s body is thrown through the door, showing her throat has also been slashed. 

After Detective Wayne is revealed to be one of the three Ghostface killers, he also reveals that Quinn had faked her death and is in fact one of his accomplices, along with her brother Ethan. It is also revealed that Richie Kirsch was Quinn’s other brother and the family are now seeking revenge on Sam for killing him. During the finale at the Ghostface shrine, Quinn finds Sam above and watches as Tara stabs her brother Ethan below. Upset at watching her brother getting attacked, she is distracted long enough for Sam to grab a gun and shoot Quinn in the forehead, killing her instantly.

Wayne Bailey
 Portrayed by Dermot Mulroney
 Appears in Scream VI
Detective Wayne Bailey is a detective investigating the latest Ghostface killings in New York City. Detective Bailey is shown as the father of Quinn Bailey, who works for the NYPD and is assigned to work on the case following the recent Ghostface attacks. He works with Kirby Reed, who is now an FBI agent to try and track down the killer. 

Wayne is shown visibly upset after his daughter has been murdered, following an attack at Sam and Tara’s apartment and reveals he has been removed from the case. He then teams with Sam to help kill whoever is behind the Ghostface mask, as revenge for his murdered daughter. 

During the finale, Wayne makes contact with Sam and reveals that Kirby had been previously fired from the FBI due to delusions regarding her previous attack and that she has trapped them in the Ghostface shrine. Once he arrives at the shrine, he shoots Kirby and reveals himself as the mastermind behind the Ghostface killings, with his son Ethan and daughter, a still alive Quinn, who he helped fake her death. Wayne also reveals that Richie Kirsch was actually his eldest son and he seeks revenge against Sam for killing him. The pair get into a fight and are thrown over a railing above the Ghostface shrine, crashing to the ground. When Wayne comes to, Sam has managed to adorn a Ghostface costume and calls him, taunting him using the voice changer. Sam manages to jump out on Wayne, violently stabbing him whilst wearing her father's Ghostface mask and costume, and then declares to Wayne that unlike her father and other killers, Wayne included, she doesn't kill for selfish reasons, she kills to protect her family. She then finishes Wayne off by stabbing him through the eye, killing him.

Reception
Neve Campbell praised the role of Sidney Prescott, saying she "adored" the character and "she's a fantastic character for any kind of movie." In 1997, the Scream role won Campbell the Saturn Award for Best Actress and an MTV Movie Award for Best Female Performance nomination. The following year she went on to win the 1998 Best Female Performance for Scream 2 and received a second nomination for the Saturn Award for Best Actress, losing to Jodie Foster for Contact (1997). She received a third and final Best Female Performance nomination from MTV in 2000 for the character in Scream 3, but lost to fellow Scream alum Sarah Michelle Gellar for Cruel Intentions (1999).

Barrymore and Ulrich also received Saturn Award nominations in 1997 for Scream, for Best Supporting Actress and Best Supporting Actor respectively. Although critical of the film itself, Variety singled out Campbell and Ulrich for praise as "charismatic", liking Cox's playing against type as the ambitious reporter Gale and saying the film had a "strong ensemble cast".

John Muir, author of Wes Craven: The Art of Horror, was critical of the new characters introduced in Scream 2 – Derek, Joel, Cici, Hallie, Lois, Murphy and Mickey – stating that they never attained the same depth of character as Scream characters such as Tatum Riley, Billy Loomis and Stu Macher, or even minor characters like Principal Himbry. Muir cited the sequel's focus on increased body counts and violence as the cause of this discrepancy in the quality of the two films' characters. He added that, as a result, Scream 2 lacked the same mystery or intrigue as the original, as the killer could be any character, purely because the audience is never provided with enough information to form an opinion of them. Roger Ebert agreed with this criticism, saying "there is no way to guess who's doing the killing, and everyone who seems suspicious is (almost) sure to be innocent."

However, Muir praised the development of the surviving characters of Scream, labeling Gale Weathers, Dewey Riley, Sidney Prescott, and Randy Meeks as "beloved" and claiming that the death of Randy was the most devastating moment of the sequel and a "bad move". Varietys Leonard Klady was more appreciative of some of the new cast, calling Laurie Metcalf and Liev Schreiber "standout" talent. Cox received a Saturn Award for Best Supporting Actress nomination for her role in Scream 2, but lost to Gloria Stuart for Titanic (1997).

On the characters of Scream 3, Roger Ebert was critical, stating "[the characters] are so thin, they're transparent", but he praised Neve Campbell's appearance as Sidney Prescott, saying "The camera loves her. She could become a really big star and then giggle at clips from this film at her AFI tribute". The New York Times praised her role equally highly, saying "She has developed as an actress; when her eyes go dark with concern and fear, she is nerve-racked and tormented, not play-acting." Harry Knowles of Ain't It Cool News was less complimentary about Campbell, saying "She adds ZERO coolness. Zero talent. And Zero charisma to [Scream 3]." The BBC's Tom Coates and Elvis Mitchell of the New York Times praised Parker Posey's character, with Mitchell saying "[Jennifer Jolie] alone makes the picture worth seeing. Dizzy and nakedly – hilariously – ambitious, she's so flighty she seems to be levitating." So well received was Posey's character that she received an MTV Movie Award for Best Comedic Performance nomination in 2000 for the role, although she lost to Adam Sandler for Big Daddy (1999). Mitchell also praised the characters of Sarah Darling (McCarthy), Tyson Fox (Richmond) and Steven Stone (Warburton), calling them "assets" to the film. In 2001, as part of the American Film Institute's AFI 100 Years... series, the character of Ghostface became one of the four hundred nominees in the "100 Heroes and Villains" category.

On the characters of Scream 4, Film 4 complimented the new additions to the cast, isolating Robbie Mercer and Charlie Walker as the best of the new characters, while the Los Angeles Times called Panettiere's film-nerd Kirby Reed "feisty", labeling her the most "intriguing" new addition to the series.

The first season of Scream has received a mixed response from critics. On the review aggregate website Rotten Tomatoes, it has a rating of 47%, based on 29 reviews, with a 5.4/10 average rating. The site's critical consensus reads, "Lacking truly compelling characters or scenarios, Scream is forced to trade too heavily on nostalgia for its big-screen predecessors in the franchise." On Metacritic, which assigns a normalized rating, the series has a score of 57 out of 100, based on 20 critics, indicating "mixed or average reviews".

In a positive review, David Hinckley from New York Daily News awarded the pilot four out of five stars and stated, "Happily, Scream maintains a sense of humor, reinforced with snappy, self-aware pop culture dialogue." Similarly, Brian Lowry of Variety commended the show's ability to maintain suspense "without much actually happening during the rest of the episode," noting its use of music, but expressing skepticism if the series could maintain its originality. Aedan Juvet of PopWrapped gave a positive assessment of the series and called it, "a prime example of a game-changing horror series." Conversely, David Wiegand of the San Francisco Chronicle panned the series and gave it one out of four stars, criticizing the acting performances as "bland, robotic, and uninteresting" as well as its apparent lack of racial diversity. In a mixed review, Mark Perigard of the Boston Herald gave the show a C+, saying, "There are a few scares here, but while the Scream films kept audiences jumping, Scream: The TV series risks putting viewers to sleep."

Awards and nominations
The cast of the Scream series have won, or been nominated for, several awards, most notably Campbell who has received the most wins and nominations of the cast for her role as Sidney Prescott, including the Saturn Award for Best Actress and MTV Movie Award for Best Performance. For Scream (1996) Skeet Ulrich and Drew Barrymore received Saturn Award nominations for Best Supporting Actor. Cox received a Saturn Award for Best Supporting Actress nomination for her role in Scream 2 but lost to Gloria Stuart for Titanic (1997). Despite her brief cameo appearance as "Sidney Prescott" in the film within a film "Stab" series, Tori Spelling was nominated for a Razzie Award for "Worst New Actress" in Scream 2.

Parker Posey's role as Jennifer Jolie received near unanimous praise from critics, with the New York Times Elvis Mitchell saying "[Posey] alone makes the picture worth seeing. Dizzy and nakedly – hilariously – ambitious, she's so flighty she seems to be levitating." So well received was her performance that she received an MTV Movie Award for Best Comedic Performance nomination in 2000 for the role but lost to Adam Sandler for Big Daddy (1999).

References

External links
 
 
 
 
 

Scream (franchise) characters
Scream (film series)
Lists of horror film characters by franchise
Characters